Weitramsdorf is a municipality in the district of Coburg in Bavaria in Germany.  It consists of the following villages: Weitramsdorf, Gersbach, Schlettach, Altenhof, Hergramsdorf, Tambach, Neundorf, Weidach and Weidach-Vogelherd.

The castle (and former monastery) of Tambach has been owned by the counts of Ortenburg since 1806.

References

Coburg (district)